Muirhead v Industrial Tank Specialties Ltd and Other [1986] QB 507 is an English Court of Appeal case concerning the recovery of pure economic loss in negligence.

Facts
This case involved various defendants. The plaintiff was Robert Muirhead were fish merchants of fishmonger who employed defendant to supply fish tanks for the plaintiff to store lobsters. Plaintiff had a scheme where he would buy lobsters in summer when they were cheaper and he would then sell them during the Christmas festive period when their price was more expensive. Plaintiff engaged Industrial Tank Specialties to design, supply and install a fish tank in which he (plaintiff) would store the lobsters. The tank needed an electric pump to circulate the seawater for the purpose of oxygenation.

Defendants (Industrial Tank Specialties) subcontracted the manufacture of motors for those pumps to Leroy Somer Electric Motors Ltd. Unfortunately the motors supplied were designed for use in France where they use a lower range of voltages than those used in England. Consequently, the pumps failed and despite the constant attempts by the plaintiff and a local electrician to keep them going, the pumps failed. This resulted in the death of the whole stock of lobsters from lack of oxygen, the lobsters suffocated or got boiled alive. The tank company was insolvent, so the plaintiff sued the French motor manufacturer in negligence for:

The cost of the pumps
The cost of cooking and refrigerating the salvaged lobsters.
The cost of the electrician who attended the pumps.
The cost of attending to the pumps themselves.
Loss of interest on capital deployed.
Loss of profit on intended sales.
The value of lost lobsters.
Damages for the inconvenience and anxiety suffered by plaintiff.

Judgment
Relying on Junior Books v. Veitchi the court allowed a claim for economic loss and gave a judgment against the motor manufacturer for damages to be assessed on grounds 1-7 above. The third defendant appealed.
The Court of Appeal overturned this application of Junior Books v. Veitchi, on the ground that Junior Books depended on its own unique and particular facts and could not be used to allow the present claim for it was pure economic loss. The court held that the plaintiff could only recover foreseeable physical loss he had suffered and any consequential economic loss he had suffered as a direct result of that physical damage.

“I therefore conclude that the third defendant should be held liable to the plaintiff, not in respect of the whole economic loss he suffered but only in respect of the physical damage caused to his stock of lobsters, and of course any financial loss suffered by the plaintiff in consequence of that physical damage”. per Robert Goff L.J. at p. 533

This case shows that the case of Junior Books v. Veitchi has been distinguished in subsequent cases in tort claims, such that it is now regarded as a decision unique upon its own facts.

English tort case law
1986 in case law
1986 in British law
Court of Appeal (England and Wales) cases